James McClure (September 28, 1916; Indianapolis, Indiana – February 12, 2005; Cape Coral, Florida) was an American international table tennis player.

Table tennis career
From 1936 to 1949 he won six medals in doubles, and team events in the World Table Tennis Championships.  This included four gold medals; three in the doubles with Buddy Blattner and Sol Schiff respectively and one in the team event.

See also
 List of table tennis players
 List of World Table Tennis Championships medalists

References

American male table tennis players
1916 births
2005 deaths